Brady High School is a public high school located in Brady, Texas (USA) and classified as a 3A school by the UIL.  It is part of the Brady Independent School District located in south central McCulloch County.  In 2015, the school was rated "Met Standard" by the Texas Education Agency.

Athletics
The Brady Bulldogs compete in these sports 

Cross Country, Football, Basketball, Powerlifting, Golf, Tennis, Track, Softball & Baseball

State Titles
Football - 
1959(2A)^
Boys Golf - 
1960(1A), 1962(2A) Bob Archer Charles Dicker Jlmmy Criswell Karlton Steffens, 1964(2A) Charles Dicker Karlton Steffens Jimmy Criswell Paul Priess

Boys Track - 
1939(All), 1950(1A), 1951(1A) 
Boys Singles Tennis- 
Jack Marshall 2018(3A)
Jack Marshall 2019(3A)

State Finalists
Football - 
1956(2A), 1957(2A)

^Brady was awarded the 1959 Class AA state football championship via forfeit over Stamford (the actual score was 19-14 Stamford).  This was the first and, as of 2013, one of only two instances where a Texas state football championship was awarded via forfeit.

Notable alumni

 Scott Appleton, former American Football League player

References

External links
Brady ISD

Public high schools in Texas
Schools in McCulloch County, Texas